The Back in Black Tour was a concert tour by the Australian hard rock band AC/DC in support of their seventh studio album Back in Black, which was released on 25 July 1980.

Background
This was AC/DC's first tour with new vocalist Brian Johnson, who replaced Bon Scott after the latter's death in February 1980, making his first appearance on stage on 29 June 1980 in Namur, Belgium. The band transported their own one-ton "Hells Bell" on the road, which was lowered to the stage each night as the bell tolls of "Hells Bells" were heard. Johnson would finish it off with several hard hits, hammer in hand as the band commenced the show.

During the North American and European legs, the band were supported by Humble Pie, Def Leppard, ZZ Top, Blackfoot, Whitesnake and Maggie Bell.

Reception
The responses from the audience during the band's performances in the United Kingdom were described as near rabid with anticipation.

Mike London from Billboard, however, had given the show he attended in New York a negative review - stating that while the band had established itself as a leader in heavy metal, the show lacked imagination and failed to live up to the band's sound, describing the stage theatrics as lifeless and overused. He noted that the fans attending the show had shown a general positive response, but later in the show grew tired of the poses and solos that Angus Young had given. Concluding his review, London stated his disappointment - saying that AC/DC's music deserved better treatment than what the band performed that night.

Setlist
 "Hells Bells"
 "Shot Down in Flames"
 "Sin City" or "Hell Ain't a Bad Place to Be"
 "Back in Black"
 "Bad Boy Boogie"
 "The Jack"
 "Highway to Hell"
 "What Do You Do for Money Honey"
 "High Voltage"
 "Shoot to Thrill" (played on occasions)
 "Givin' the Dog a Bone" (played on occasions)
 "Whole Lotta Rosie"
 "You Shook Me All Night Long"
 "Rocker" or "Problem Child" or "Rock and Roll Ain't Noise Pollution" (played on occasions)
 "T.N.T." or "Shake a Leg" ("Shake a Leg" played once)
 "Let There Be Rock"

Tour dates

Cancelled dates

Box office score data

Personnel
Angus Young – lead guitar
Cliff Williams – bass guitar, backing vocals
Malcolm Young – rhythm guitar, backing vocals
Phil Rudd – drums
Brian Johnson – lead vocals

Notes

References

Citations

Sources
 
 

AC/DC concert tours
1980 concert tours
1981 concert tours